Luis Ángel Gil (born June 3, 1998) is a Dominican professional baseball pitcher for the New York Yankees of Major League Baseball (MLB). He made his MLB debut in 2021.

Career

Minor leagues
Gil signed with the Minnesota Twins as an international free agent in 2015 for a $90,000 signing bonus. He made his professional debut that season with the Dominican Summer League Twins, going 1–2 with a 4.63 ERA over  innings. After not pitching in 2016, he spent 2017 with the Dominican Summer League Twins, pitching to a 0–2 record with a 2.59 ERA over 14 starts.

On March 16, 2018, the Twins traded Gil to the New York Yankees for Jake Cave. He spent the season with the Pulaski Yankees and Staten Island Yankees, compiling a combined 2–3 record and 1.96 ERA over 12 starts, striking out 68 over 46 innings. He started 2019 with the Charleston RiverDogs, and was promoted to the Tampa Tarpons in July. Over twenty starts between the two teams, Gil went 5–5 with a 2.72 ERA, compiling 123 strikeouts over 96 innings.

Gil began the 2021 season with the Somerset Patriots and was promoted to the Scranton/Wilkes-Barre RailRiders in June. On July 21, Gil combined with Reggie McClain and Stephen Ridings to throw a no-hitter for the RailRiders.

New York Yankees
The Yankees promoted him to the major leagues on August 3, 2021, making his major league debut with a start against the Baltimore Orioles. He pitched six innings, allowed four hits and recorded six strikeouts, earning the win.

Gil started his career with  scoreless innings, the most by any Yankee pitcher since 1961. He is the  first pitcher in MLB history with a scoreless start in his first three appearances.

On May 21, 2022, it was announced that Gil would require Tommy John surgery and miss the remainder of the 2022 season.

References

External links

1998 births
Living people
Charleston RiverDogs players
Dominican Republic expatriate baseball players in the United States
Dominican Summer League Twins players
Major League Baseball pitchers
Major League Baseball players from the Dominican Republic
New York Yankees players
People from Azua Province
Pulaski Yankees players
Scranton/Wilkes-Barre RailRiders players
Somerset Patriots players
Staten Island Yankees players
Tampa Tarpons players
Tigres del Licey players